This is a list of lists of fictional extraterrestrial species.

Alphabetical

A, B, C, D, E, F, G, H, I, J, K, L, M, N, O, P, Q, R, S, T, U, V, W, X, Y, Z

By medium & franchise

Literature

 List of Noon Universe alien races

Comics

 List of alien races in DC Comics 
 List of alien races in Marvel Comics

Film & television

 Species of the Marvel Cinematic Universe
 List of Star Wars creatures 
 Lists of Star Wars species: A–E, F–J, K–O, P–T, U–Z
 List of Doctor Who universe creatures and aliens 
 List of Star Trek aliens

Games

 Races of StarCraft
 Battlelords of the 23rd Century#Races

By appearance

 List of humanoid aliens
 List of reptilian humanoids

See also